Cynthia MacLeod is a Canadian fiddler from Prince Edward Island. She describes her fiddling style as "Cape Breton". In addition to recording, hosting standing-room-only ceilidhs in Brackley Beach, and touring, she teaches workshops both in Canada and the United States.

Discography
Head over Heels (2002)
Crackerjack (2004)
Hot Off the Floor (2007)
Riddle (2010)
Live at the Brackley Beach Ceilidh (2012)

Awards

Notes

External links
 Artist's bio page
 Cape Breton Fiddle Recording Artist Index
 Music Prince Edward Island

Living people
Musicians from Prince Edward Island
Canadian women violinists and fiddlers
21st-century Canadian violinists and fiddlers
Year of birth missing (living people)
Cape Breton fiddlers